Michael Matas (born March 23, 1986) is an American user interface designer and icon artist. He has previously worked at The Omni Group doing interface and graphic design work. Matas co-founded Delicious Monster In 2005 he went to work for Apple, where he designed user interfaces and artwork for the iPhone, the iPad and Mac OS X.

Now, he's the co-founder of Push Pop Press, a digital publishing company just purchased by Facebook. Push Pop's first title is Al Gore's "Our Choice," playable on iPad, iPhone and iPod Touch. in 2004 together with Wil Shipley. 

He later worked at Apple, Inc. and designed some of the major user interfaces in Mac OS X, iOS for Apple products. In addition, he has been listed as the co-inventor on patents Apple has filed. 

He later left Apple.

Career

Facebook 
During his time at Facebook he was integral to the design of Facebook Paper (along with Kimon Tsinteris). Facebook Paper's direct descendent was also created by Matas and Tsinteris, Facebook Instant Articles.

Nest 
After Apple, Matas worked on the team that designed the Nest Learning Thermostat. He then founded Push Pop Press, a digital publishing company that created Al Gore's interactive book Our Choice.

Matas presented at TED in 2011 on his work at Push Pop for Al Gore's interactive book Our Choice.

Lobe.ai 
He is currently working with Adam Menges, and Markus Beissinger on a new start-up, Lobe.ai. Lobe.ai is "creating an easy-to-use visual tool to help give people from diverse backgrounds and disciplines the ability to invent with deep learning". It was announced that Lobe would be acquired by Microsoft in September 2018.

LoveFrom 
In October 2021, Mike announced on Twitter that he had joined LoveFrom, the design firm that Sir Jony Ive and Marc Newson started after their departure from Apple.

References

External links 
 Personal Site

1986 births
Living people
Apple Inc. employees
Facebook employees